Philipp Nauß (3 December 1881 – 15 July 1958) was an Austrian footballer. He played in one match for the Austria national football team in 1902.

References

External links
 

1881 births
1958 deaths
Austrian footballers
Austria international footballers
Place of birth missing
Association footballers not categorized by position